Marat Mansurovych Deviatiarov (born 19 April 1994 in Kharkiv) is a Ukrainian tennis player.

Career
Deviatiarov has a career high ATP singles ranking of 538 achieved on 25 May 2015. He also has a career high ATP doubles ranking of 315 achieved on 25 September 2017.

Deviatiarov has represented Ukraine at the Davis Cup where he has a W/L record of 1–0.

Future and Challenger finals

Singles: 7 (1–6)

Doubles: 45 (20–25)

External links

1994 births
Living people
Ukrainian male tennis players
Sportspeople from Kharkiv
21st-century Ukrainian people